The name Mawar has been used to name three tropical cyclones in the northwestern Pacific Ocean. The name was contributed by Malaysia, which means a rose.

 Typhoon Mawar (2005) (T0511, 11W) – struck Japan.
 Typhoon Mawar (2012) (T1203, 04W, Ambo)
 Tropical Storm Mawar (2017) (T1716, 18W)

Pacific typhoon set index articles